Burgan may refer to:
 Lake Burgan, a lake in Minnesota
 Burgan-e Bala, a village in South Khorasan Province, Iran
 Burgan-e Pain, a village in South Khorasan Province, Iran
 Burgan Field, an oil field in Kuwait
 Burgan Bank, a Kuwait-based bank
 Kunzea ericoides, a plant also known as Burgan